The Teifi Valley Railway (Welsh: Rheilffordd Dyffryn Teifi) is a  narrow gauge railway occupying a section of the former standard gauge Great Western Railway line between Llandysul and Newcastle Emlyn.

In 2014, the railway closed and much of the track was lifted.

History
The Teifi Valley Railway occupies a section of the route formerly occupied by a standard gauge line between Llandysul and Newcastle Emlyn, itself built as an extension of the original Carmarthen and Cardigan Railway by the Great Western Railway in the late 19th Century.

Background
With the opening of the South Wales Railway, Carmarthen's economic prosperity grew. A scheme to link Carmarthen with a proposed deep-water port in Cardigan found form as the Carmarthen and Cardigan Railway; a troubled scheme which opened in stages (hindered by the challenging topography of the Gwili valley and the sheer expense incurred in the construction of the Pencader Tunnel). Despite its name, the company only achieved construction of a line as far Llandysul, opening in 1864. The company fell into receivership shortly thereafter.

With the ambition of furthering the line to Newcastle Emlyn, The Tivy Side Railway Company was incorporated and authorised to extend the line. Despite progressing to the point where the project received an authorising Act of Parliament, the scheme never became a reality and the extension remained unbuilt.

Amidst an uncertain future and a difficult financial position, the Carmarthen and Cardigan Railway was eventually leased to the Great Western Railway, with absorption by the latter taking place by 1882. The corresponding Act of Parliament combined the authorising of both the sale of the undertaking with re-authorising the construction of an extension to Newcastle Emlyn.

Construction from Llandysul
Preparations to extend the line beyond Llandysul remained slow; only by March 1890 were the Great Western Railway inviting tenders for the construction contract. Progress was hampered by the abandonment of the contract by the original contractor, a Mr Rugby; however construction, led by a Mr Jones of Neath, was underway by March 1892, with completion of the extension anticipated by the end of the following year. By July 1893, the construction had reached Trebedw, but completion remained elusive. With much fanfare and celebration, the line between Llandysul and Newcastle Emlyn was finally opened in July 1895. There was one intermediate station at Henllan; joined by Pentrecourt Halt, which opened in 1912, seventeen years after the line opened. The opening of an additional intermediate halt had been subject to extensive local support and petitioning.

With the Great Western Railway's link to Cardigan from Carmarthen via the Whitland and Cardigan Railway and South Wales Railway, the route did not extend beyond Newcastle Emlyn. The line never progressed further.

Abandonment
The line ultimately carried passengers for less than sixty years; being a rural branch line and serving a sparse local population, the passenger service was withdrawn along on 13 September 1952, a consequence of post-nationalisation rationalisation.

In addition to enthusiast railtours, freight traffic continued until 1973. The entirety of the line between the Carmarthen and Newcastle Emlyn stations closed in September 1973 (Pentrecourt Halt had closed with the cessation of passenger services in 1952, and Henllan had closed in 1965).

The structures and earthworks comprising the permanent way of the former line remained in place in their entirety. Station sites were either demolished or redeveloped.

Preservation
The Dyfed Railway Company was incorporated on 5 December 1973 as a vehicle for purchasing the trackbed and attaining a requisite Light Railway Order. Preservation efforts were initially lead by Dr. George Penn, with early efforts focused on purchase of the line before it was dismantled, and running a preserved standard gauge undertaking. However, such efforts were not as successful as the concurrent project further down the valleys at Bronwydd Arms railway station, where the Gwili Railway had been successful in negotiating the purchase of a single mile of in situ track; the Newcastle Emlyn branch was lifted in 1975.

Eventually, a Light Railway Order was acquired and the trackbed, between the sites of Llandysul and Newcastle Emlyn stations, was purchased. By 1983, a single kilometre of  gauge track had been laid between the original site of Henllan station and a site adjacent to a bridge spanning a deep gully. This site was given the designation of Pontprenshitw Station. The railway was formally opened to the public by Peter Prior CBE on 9 April 1986.

In 1989, the line was extended to a site near Llandyfriog village, and finally, in 2006, the line was extended along the original alignment to the point of a removed over bridge that previously spanned the River Teifi. This terminus was named Llandyfriog Riverside.

Additionally, from July 2009, the Henllan platform was relocated to the site of the original platforms, having occupied a site to the immediate west of the Henllan road overbridge since 1983.

Recent developments
In recent years, the Railway suffered a loss of trained and managerial personnel, as well as volunteers essential for the line's operation. A licence agreement delegated certain functions of the railway and the site to a local businessman. The condition of the railway declined to a state where, in 2014, an ORR inspection raised significant concerns about the safety of the track. In response, the licensee arranged for the removal of the track between Henllan and Pontprenshitw, and commenced the operation of a 'land train' (tractor-hauled carriages).

During this time, items of rolling stock left the station site, and a significant amount of tree felling took place beyond the Pontprenshitw Station site. In addition, the former licensee was made subject to a bankruptcy order.

Former members of railway management and operations staff returned to oversee and support restoration efforts. Site repair and rejuvenation, and track relaying, is ongoing.

The route 
When the full length of the narrow gauge line was operational between Henllan and Llandyfriog Riverside, the route progressed westwards through forest lands before emerging onto an embankment on the northern side of the Teifi Valley. A succession of bridges carried the alignment over access points and tributaries to the River Teifi. The alignment gradually descended to slightly above river level, terminating at the point where the original Great Western Railway line crossed the River Teifi, at Pont Goch.

The trackbed eastwards from Henllan Station is owned by the Teifi Valley Railway company as far as the site of the former Pentrecourt Halt, and remains subject to future restoration plans. This route avoids the need for major bridges, but required lengths of embankments and cuttings as well as one short tunnel. With a few exceptions, the trackbed is mostly complete.

The remaining two sections of the original Great Western Railway line (between Pont Goch and Newcastle Emlyn; and between Pentrecourt Halt and Llandysul) are less likely to see future restoration, as the removal of original railway bridges crossing the Teifi mean that they are severed from the alignment on which the narrow gauge line has been built. Additionally, much of the route into Llandysul from the west had been demolished or landscaped.

The narrow gauge section
For the sake of clarity, this section will describe the route of the narrow gauge line when fully operational prior to 2014.

The first kilometre due west out of Henllan runs on a shallow embankment through forest. The only overbridge on the line is immediately west of Henllan station carrying the B4334 over the railway.

Around a short north-westerly curve lines Pontprenshitw Station, the terminus when operations began in 1985. This station was named after the substantial single-arch brick-built bridge carrying the railway over the River Cynllo gorge and a historic leat, which sits just to the west of the station. The bridge, structure number 54 on the line, was built by Joseph Hamlet of West Bromwich in 1893. The name, Pontprenshitw, either refers to the wooden frame used during the construction of the bridge, or to an access structure over the Cynllo that pre-dated the railway.

The line was extended west of Pontprenshitw in 1989. It runs on an embankment that forms part of the Teifi Valley wall. The route crosses Bridge 55, 'Mini-Pont', a small arched access bridge, and along a short straight section to Llandyfriog station. This was the second terminus of the line, opened in 1989, and was also a new station with a passing loop. Llandyfriog Station closed when the railway was extended again in 2006.

The 2006 extension took the line to Llandyfriog Riverside station. The route ran alongside the A475 on a low embankment, then crossed three small access underbridges. The line ended just before Pont Goch - a double-span girder bridge which carried the GWR line over the River Teifi. The bridge was left in place upon closure in 1973, partially collapsed in 1987 and one span was removed. The eastern span remains sound, and was used as a viewing point at Llandyfriog Riverside station.

Rolling stock and locomotives

Details from except where noted.

Carriages

Wagons

See also
British narrow gauge railways
Heritage railway

References

External links
Official Site

Heritage railways in Carmarthenshire
Heritage railways in Ceredigion
2 ft gauge railways in Wales